Sascha Scheleter (born January 13, 1985) is a German bobsledder who has competed since 2006. His best Bobsleigh World Cup finish was fifth twice (Two-man - January 2007, Four-man - January 2008).

References
FIBT profile

1985 births
German male bobsledders
Living people
Place of birth missing (living people)
21st-century German people